Mary Wamaua Waithira Noroge is a Kenyan politician. She is currently Member of Parliament for Maragua Constituency in Murang’a County.

Early years and education 
She went to Kamahuha Girls High for her o level certificate and from 1983 to 1991. She proceeded to Kigari Teachers Training College and acquired a P1 certificate. From 2008 to 2009 she joined the KIHBIT in Kisii to pursue a Diploma in Civil Works-in Road Building. From 2014 to 2016 she furthered her education at Gretsa University and undertook a Bachelor of Arts comm. Development.

Career 
She was elected as the member of parliament for Maragua Constituency in 2017. She is a member of National Government Constituencies Development Fund Committee in the parliament.

She was re-elected in the 2022 Kenyan general election.

References 

Living people
Members of the National Assembly (Kenya)
Year of birth missing (living people)
Members of the 12th Parliament of Kenya
Members of the 13th Parliament of Kenya
21st-century Kenyan politicians
21st-century Kenyan women politicians